Westminster Kingsway College is a large college for further education in central London with centres in King's Cross in Camden, together with Victoria and Soho centres in Westminster. Founded in 2000 and having origins dating back to 1910, the college is part of Capital City College Group, alongside City and Islington College and The College of Haringey, Enfield and North East London. Altogether, the group have over 25,000 enrolled students as of 2020. Westminster Kingsway College provides further, adult and higher education programmes, including full-time and part-time vocational, professional and academic courses at different levels.

Campuses and facilities

Assisted Learning Support
One of the college's most notable features is the assisted learning support or (ALS). This department has around 25 staff members who contribute to one of the most progressive and comprehensive learning support departments in central London.  The learner support offered can range from a hand in study skills for people who are re-entering education, to care and guidance for students with (ASD) and other learning disabilities.

History

The college was founded in September 2000 following the merger of Westminster and Kingsway Colleges. The Victoria Centre, where the School of Hospitality first opened its doors to learners in 1910, celebrated its centenary in 2010. Based in Vincent Square, the centre houses the college's own restaurant, The Vincent Rooms, with cuisine prepared and served by second and third year professional chef students.

The college provides community education, with a programme of neighbourhood learning in partnership with Camden Council and in Westminster with local organisations.

The college's specialist subjects have been given to vocational training including Hospitality, Creative Media, Performing Arts, Business and Public Administration. It also provides higher education for about 250 full-time equivalent students on foundation degrees in business, Hospitality Management, Culinary Arts, Travel & Tourism, Accounting and Public Administration.

Westminster College began as a School of Hospitality in Vincent Square in 1910 when in 1908 a consultative committee which included Sir Isidore Salmon, Auguste Escoffier and César Ritz was established to design training programmes in professional cookery in readiness to produce graduates that could work in London's finest hotels. The first course to be developed was the Cookery Technical Day School, which was soon to be formulated into the Professional Chef Diploma. Within a couple of years, the school had added food service to its course portfolio and a training restaurant was opened. Records show that this was in fact the UK's first Hospitality School established in 1910.

The school developed during the interwar years as additional kitchens, cold rooms and larder and pastry areas were added. A two-year hotel manager's course replaced the food service course. There were plans for a 50-bedroom 'training hotel', which had begun construction in 1939. This unfortunately was stopped as a result of the outbreak of war and was never completed.

Following the Second World War, the Vincent Rooms restaurant was extended, and in 1953 the Escoffier Restaurant was opened. Further kitchens were added as well as a wine cellar. The restaurants have evolved over a considerable period of time alongside the School of Hospitality and Culinary Arts at Westminster Kingsway College producing graduates who are now working in hotels and restaurants all over the world. In 1985 there was a substantial and comprehensive refit of the whole school.

Before the merger, Kingsway College, previously known as Princeton College, was a large college in Camden. It received £55million for redevelopment in 2009. Notable Principals included Fred Flower from 1960 to 1978. Regarded as one of the great humanist educators of his day, under Flower's leadership, Kingsway became one of the country's most diverse and thriving further education colleges, and his skill provided a framework for the development of unconventional ideas which came to powerfully influence British post-16 education. Flower sat on both the Newsom (1963) and the Taylor (1977) committees.

On 1 August 2016, Westminster Kingsway College merged with City and Islington College to form the WKCIC Group, trading as Capital City College Group  joined CCCG, making the Group the largest further education and training provider in London.</ref>

External assessment

QAA
The Quality Assurance Agency for Higher Education independently assessed the college in 2010. It concluded that: " ... the ... review team ... considers that there can be confidence in the college’s management of its responsibilities, as set out in its partnership agreements, for the standards of the awards it offers on behalf of its awarding bodies. ... also considers that there can be confidence in the college’s management of its responsibilities, as set out in its partnership agreements, for the quality of learning opportunities it offers. ... reliance can be placed on the accuracy and completeness of the information that the college is responsible for publishing about itself and the programmes it delivers."

Notable alumni

Clare Benedict, actor
Kathy Burke – Comedian
Michelle Collins – Actress
Eliza Doolittle – Singer/Songwriter
Catherine Ennis, organist
Ainsley Harriott – Celebrity chef
Leon Lai – Actor & Singer
Little Simz - Rapper, Singer & Actress
John Lydon – Sex Pistols vocalist and later, singer with post-punk band Public Image Ltd. 
Steve McFadden – Actor
Toby Mott – Artist
Trevor Nelson – DJ for Kiss FM, DJ with Soul II Soul and currently, BBC Radio DJ. 
Jamie Oliver – Celebrity chef
Nathaniel Peat - Entrepreneur, Reality TV winner
Gillian Taylforth - Actress
Sid Vicious – member of punk rock outfit formed with Marco Pirroni, The Flowers of Romance (British band) and later, Sex Pistols Bassist.
Jah Wobble – Bassist with post-punk band Public Image Ltd.
Antony Worrall Thompson – Celebrity chef
Sophie Wright, chef
Timothy Spall - Actor

References

External links

 Official Westminster Kingsway College website, Accessed 4 March 2020

Further education colleges in London
Education in the City of Westminster
Educational institutions established in 2000
2000 establishments in England
2000 in London